Tonnie Harry Cusell Lilipaly (born 4 February 1983), is a former footballer who previously plays as a midfielder for GVVV in Topklasse. Born in the Netherlands, he represented Indonesia at international level.

Club career
Cusell played for 18 clubs in 25 years time, primarily in Dutch football. In 2013 he left Topklasse club GVVV for Ajax, only to leave them for a stint with Indonesian side Barito Putera.

He finished his career in June 2016 after another season at Ajax Amateurs.

International career 
At the age of 29 years old he made his international debut for the Indonesia national team on November 14, 2012 in friendly match against Timor Leste. He retired from the national team in 2014.

Personal life
His cousin Stefano Lilipaly is also a footballer.

References

External links
 
 

1983 births
Living people
Footballers from Amsterdam
Indonesian footballers
Indonesia international footballers
Dutch footballers
Dutch emigrants to Indonesia
Dutch people of Indonesian descent
Naturalised citizens of Indonesia
Association football midfielders
Indonesian expatriate footballers
AFC DWS players
ADO '20 players
Amsterdamsche FC players
AFC Ajax (amateurs) players
PS Barito Putera players
FC Hilversum players